Painsley Catholic College is a Roman Catholic secondary school with academy status in Cheadle, Staffordshire, England. The name comes from Painsley Hall, Draycott in the Moors, from which the Painsley and Draycott Mission served the neighbouring areas and from which grew those parishes now connected with the college.  It is also part of a multi-academy company made up of Painsley and its six feeder schools.

Curriculum 

Painsley Catholic College is a specialist science, maths and computing college.

Alumni
Adam Yates: Professional footballer
Gareth Owen: Professional footballer
Rachel Shenton: Actress
Adam Peaty: Swimmer; Olympic gold medalist 
Levison Wood: Explorer
Emre Tezgel: Professional footballer

References

External links
 Painsley Official Website

Secondary schools in Staffordshire
Catholic secondary schools in the Archdiocese of Birmingham
Academies in Staffordshire
Cheadle, Staffordshire
Specialist maths and computing colleges in England
Specialist science colleges in England